Source Sans (known as Source Sans Pro before 2021) is a sans-serif typeface created by Paul D. Hunt, released by Adobe in 2012. It is the first open-source font family from Adobe, distributed under the SIL Open Font License.

The typeface is inspired by the forms of the American Type Founders' gothics by Morris Fuller Benton, such as News Gothic, Lightline Gothic and Franklin Gothic, modified with both a larger x-height and character width and more humanist-influenced italic forms. It is available in six weights (Regular, ExtraLight, Light, Semibold, Bold, Black) in upright and italic styles, and is also available as a variable font with continuous weight values from 200 to 900. The typeface has wide language support for Latin script, including Western and Eastern European languages, Vietnamese, pinyin Romanization of Chinese, and Navajo. Adobe's training material highlights it as having a more consistent colour on the page than the rather condensed News Gothic it is based on.


See also
 Benton Sans – another commercial Benton revival, optimised for various weights, widths and optical masters for various sizes of text
 Trade Gothic – Linotype's competing design

Adobe's open source family
 Source Code Pro, the second member of Adobe's open source family, a monospaced sans serif
 Source Serif, the third member of Adobe's open source family
 Source Han Sans, the fourth member of Adobe's open source family and the first to include CJK characters
 Source Han Serif, the last member of Adobe's open source family and includes CJK characters

References

External links

 Source Sans Pro at Adobe
 Source Sans Pro specimen on GitHub
 GitHub project page

Grotesque sans-serif typefaces
Free software Unicode typefaces
Adobe typefaces
Typefaces and fonts introduced in 2012
Typefaces with text figures
Typefaces designed by Paul D. Hunt
IPA typefaces